Loran Vladimirovich Alekno (born 18 September 1996) is former Russian volleyball player, known as a player for Russian club Zenit Kazan.

Personal life
He is son of notable volleyball head coach Vladimir Alekno. He has an older sister Ekaterina (born 1987).

Career
In 2017 Zenit Kazan coached by his father, added him to the main roster as backup setter. Previously he was educated in volleyball Academy of Kazan. On 17 December 2017 his team won the 2017 Club World Champion title.

Sporting achievements

Clubs

FIVB Club World Championship
  Poland 2017 – with Zenit Kazan
  Betim 2019 – with Zenit Kazan

National championship
 2016/2017  Russian Cup, with Zenit Kazan
 2016/2017  Russian Championship, with Zenit Kazan

National team
 2014  FIVB U21 World Championship

References

1996 births
Living people
Russian men's volleyball players